Mazayjan castle is a historical castle located in Zarrin Dasht County in Fars Province.

References 

Castles in Iran